Fawn Johnson is an American journalist. She is a correspondent for National Journal and writes from the national perspective on domestic policy issues.  She appears occasionally on PBS with the Washington Week with Gwen Ifill and occasionally as a guest or interviewee on National Public Radio.  She resides in Washington, DC, with her family.

Career
 Congressional Reporter, BNA Inc. - labor, welfare, immigration, and asbestos liability
 Reporter, CongressDaily - health care, labor, and immigration.
 Reporter, Dow Jones Newswires - financial regulation and telecommunications
 Reporter, The Wall Street Journal - financial regulation and telecommunications 
 Correspondent, National Journal - domestic policy issues: gun control, transportation, and education
 Guest Panelist, Washington Week with Gwen Ifill, PBS

Johnson is a correspondent for National Journal, covering domestic policy issues such as gun control, transportation, and education. She specialises in immigration, having covered it since the Clinton administration.

Education
 B.A., Bates College
 M.A., Annenberg School for Communication, University of Pennsylvania

References

External links
 Fawn Johnson Facebook page
 

Year of birth missing (living people)
Living people
NPR personalities
PBS people
American women journalists
The Wall Street Journal people
Bates College alumni
Annenberg School for Communication at the University of Pennsylvania alumni
21st-century American women